The 1964 United States presidential election in Tennessee took place on November 3, 1964, as part of the 1964 United States presidential election. Tennessee voters chose 11 representatives, or electors, to the Electoral College, who voted for president and vice president.

Tennessee was won by incumbent President Lyndon B. Johnson (D–Texas), with 55.50% of the popular vote, against Senator Barry Goldwater (R–Arizona), with 44.49% of the popular vote.

Results

Results by county

References

Tennessee
1964
1964 Tennessee elections